OXT or oxt may refer to:
 .oxt, the file name extension for software extension files used by Apache OpenOffice and LibreOffice. See OpenOffice.org#Extensions.
 Oxytocin, a hormone
  OXT, the gene for oxytocin
 OxT, a Japanese musical group
 The station code for Oxted railway station